The 1946 United States Senate election in Virginia was held on November 5, 1946. Incumbent Senator Harry F. Byrd Sr. was re-elected to a fourth term after defeating Republican Lester S. Parsons.

Results

See also 

 1946 United States Senate elections

References

Virginia
1946
United States Senate